Sanballat the Horonite ( Sanḇallaṭ) – or Sanballat I – was a Samaritan leader and official of the Achaemenid Empire who lived in the mid to late 5th century BC and was a contemporary of Nehemiah. He and his family are mentioned in the contemporary Elephantine papyri and ostraca.

Etymology
In Hebrew the name is Sanḇallaṭ. Eberhard Schrader, cited in Brown–Driver–Briggs, considered that the name in Akkadian was Sīn-uballiṭ (30.TI.LA) from the name of the Sumerian moon god Sīn meaning "Sīn gave life".

The name of the god Sīn in the context of Sanballat's name has since been mistakenly confused with the unrelated English noun sin in some popular English commentaries on Nehemiah. Other earlier commentators had sometimes taken Sanballat as being a military rank rather than a name.

Biblical account

Book of Nehemiah
Sanballat is best known from the Book of Nehemiah, which casts him as one of the chief opponents of the Jewish governor Nehemiah during the latter's efforts to rebuild the walls of Jerusalem and carrying out his reforms among the Jews. In Jewish tradition, he was called "the Horonite," (from "Horon", possibly identified with present-day Huwara) and was associated with Tobiah the Ammonite and Geshem the Arabian. His home was evidently in Samaria.

According to Nehemiah, when he and his escort arrived in Jerusalem, their return aroused the enmity of Sanballat and his allies. They were aggrieved that the welfare of the Jews should be fostered. When Nehemiah actually disclosed his intention of building the walls of Jerusalem they laughed him to scorn, and said, "Will ye rebel against the king?" Nehemiah resented their insinuation, and told them that they had no right in Jerusalem, nor any interest in its affairs. As soon as Sanballat and his associates heard that Nehemiah and the Jews were actually building the walls, they were angry; and Sanballat addressed the army of Samaria with a contemptuous reference to "these feeble Jews." Tobiah appeased him by saying that a fox (or a jackal) climbing on the wall they were building would break it down. Nehemiah and his builders, the Jews, vigorously hurried the work, while Sanballat and his associates organized their forces to fight against Jerusalem. Nehemiah prepared to meet the opposition and continued the work on the walls. Five different times Sanballat and his confederates challenged Nehemiah and the Jews to meet them for a parley in the plain of Ono. Nehemiah was equal to the emergency and attended strictly to his work. Then Sanballat, with Jews in Jerusalem who were his confederates, attempted to entrap Nehemiah in the Temple; but the scheme failed. Sanballat's Jewish allies, however, kept Sanballat and Tobiah informed as to the progress of the work in Jerusalem. With the hand of the Lord upon Nehemiah along with Nehemiah's far-sighted policy and his shrewdness, he was kept out of the hands of these neighbor-foes. In his reforms, so effectively carried out, he discovered that one of the grandsons of the current high priest Eliashib had married a daughter of this Sanballat,  and was thus son-in-law of the chief enemy of the Jews. Nehemiah also found that Eliashib had leased the storerooms of the temple to Tobiah, thus depriving the Levites of their share of the offerings in Nehemiah's absence. The high priest (and/or possibly his son Jehoida and the unnamed grandson) was driven out of Jerusalem on the ground that he had defiled the priesthood.

Book of Zechariah
It has been speculated that the business dealings of Sanballat with the descendants of Joshua the High Priest, in particular with Jeshua's grandson, the then current high priest Eliashib, and with Jeshua's great-grandson who had betrothed his son to a daughter of Sanballat, may form part of the context for the "vision" of Jeshua in a heavenly tribunal between the angel of the Lord and a Satan figure in Book of Zechariah chapter 3. It is also noted by medieval Jewish commentators David Kimhi, Rashi and Moses ibn Ezra, though ibn Ezra after considering the connection rejects it.

Josephus
Josephus (Antiquities xi. 7, § 2.) places Sanballat later on in Persian history, during the reign of Darius III (336–331 BCE). He likely confused this Sanballat with one of his successors, possibly Sanballat II or Sanballat III. Josephus's story is probably a traditional account of the origin of the Samaritan Temple on Mount Gerizim. Josephus records the marriage of Manasseh and Sanballat's daughter from Nehemiah 13:28 as actually having taken place and causing the founding of the temple.

Elephantine papyri
In the Elephantine papyri Sanballat is said to have had two sons, Delaiah bar Sanballat and Shelemiah bar Sanballat. The Jews of Elephantine asked for the help of Sanballat's sons in rebuilding the Jewish temple at Elephantine, which had been damaged or destroyed by rioters.

Modern research
According to Magen (2007) he appears to have been the scion of a veteran Samaritan family of the Israelite remnant originating in Horon, perhaps to be identified with the village of Huwara at the foot of Mount Gerizim.

According to Yitzakh Magen's reconstruction, he was commander of a garrison force who rose to be appointed governor of Samaria, the first of the Israelites to achieve this rank, sometime prior to Nehemiah's return from exile, and arrival in Judea in 444 BCE. In order to unite Samaria and its populations, he thought a sacred site was necessary. The Levite priesthood had migrated to Judea, and the priests of Baal were idolatrous, and he chose from tradition Mount Gerizim, over whose site he chose a high priest from a noble family in Jerusalem, a grandson of Eliashib, to preside, and to whom he gave his own daughter in marriage. He established a temple to YHWH on Mount Gerizim, over which his own descendants, as born into priestly blood, could minister. Josephus describes his construction of the Samaritan temple and says it was based on a copy of the Jerusalem temple.<ref>Josephus,Antinquities of the Jews 11.302–312, 322–325</ref> He also relates that many Israelites married to Samaritans moved to Samaria, causing much bewilderment in Jerusalem.

Modern use
In the first half of the 20th century, the radical nationalist poet and political activist Uri Zvi Greenberg – considered the spiritual mentor of Revisionist Zionism and of the present Israeli settlers on the West Bank – regularly used the term "The Sanballats" or "The Sanballat Gang" (כנופית הסנבלטים) as a catch-all term of abuse for antisemites and Palestinian nationalists as well as for political opponents from the Socialist Zionist camp.

See also
List of biblical figures identified in extra-biblical sources

Notes

References
Jacobs, Joseph and Ira Price. "Sanballat." Jewish Encyclopedia''. Funk and Wagnalls, 1901–1906.

5th-century BC Asian people
Ancient Samaritan people
Ezra–Nehemiah
Hebrew Bible people
People from the Achaemenid Empire